Ankyrin repeat domain 35  also known as ANKRD35 is a protein which in humans is encoded by the ANKRD35 gene.

Related gene problems
TAR syndrome
1q21.1 deletion syndrome
1q21.1 duplication syndrome

References